Mahmudova  Rukhshona Toyir Kizi (born 21 March 1994) is a singer, actress, and TV presenter. The singer was awarded "Badge of Uzbekistan".

Personal life 
Ruxshona was born on 21 March 1994 in Tashkent. In 2010, Ruxshona participated in a music project of Akfa media company. From 2007 to 2010, she studied at the Republican Variety and Circus College. Since 2019 she has been a student at the University of Journalism and Mass Communication. In 2014, Ruxshona married film director Sanjar Matkarimov. In 2015, Ruxshona's daughter Habiba was born. The following year, in 2016, her son Shukurbek was born.

Career

Singing career 
Ruxshona started her singing career in 2010. Ruxshona's first single Yuragim became a hit in Uzbekistan and she gained fame in pop culture. Following the success of Yuragim, Ruxshona released her first album, Azizim in 2011. The Album became one of the best selling albums of the year. In 2011, she sang in a duet with Avraam Russo.

Ruxshona's second album Joni-joni was released in 2013 and became another hit album for her. Album's first single "Yuragim" was released on radio channels and was received well by fans. Singles such as "Shekilli", "Yana yana", "Vatan", "Unutma meni" also became hits. Ruxshona has more than 60 original songs and more than 25 clips.

Acting career 
Ruxshona has portrayed main characters in several Uzbek movies. Shomurod va Durdona, in which Ruxshona played the lead role, did well in box office and Ruxshona received positive reviews for her role. She also played the leading role in the 2011 Uzbek movie "Enagalar". The soundtrack for the movie "Zamonaviy sovchilar" was sung by Ruxshona herself. Ruxshona played at movie called Kutilmagan qongiroq which was popular among uzbek people.

Discography

Studio albums 
 "Azizim" (2011)
 "Joni-joni" (2013)

Filmography 
This is a chronologically-ordered list of films in which Ruxshona has appeared.

Music videos

References

External links
 

Living people
1994 births
20th-century Uzbekistani women singers
Uzbekistani film actresses
Uzbekistani television presenters
Uzbekistani women television presenters
21st-century Uzbekistani actresses
Mass media people from Tashkent
Folk-pop singers